Alfredo Rego (born 29 December 1946) is a Guatemalan alpine skier. He competed in two events at the 1988 Winter Olympics. In 1986, Rego founded the Guatemala Skiing Association.

References

1946 births
Living people
Guatemalan male alpine skiers
Olympic alpine skiers of Guatemala
Alpine skiers at the 1988 Winter Olympics
Place of birth missing (living people)